Chenar Barm-e Olya (also Romanized as Chenār Barm-e ‘Olyā and Chenār Barm ‘Olyā; also known as Chenār Baram-e Bālā, Chenār Barm-e Bālā, and Chenār Bon-e Bālā) is a village in Pataveh Rural District, Pataveh District, Dana County, Kohgiluyeh and Boyer-Ahmad Province, Iran. At the 2006 census, its population was 854, in 157 families.

References 

Populated places in Dana County